"Miles From Nowhere" is a song by the American alternative rock group The Smithereens. It is the first single released in support of their fifth album A Date with The Smithereens.

Formats and track listing 
All songs written by Pat DiNizio, except where noted.
US CD single (RDJ-62820-2)
"Miles From Nowhere" – 4:18
"Keep Me Running (demo)" – 2:50
"Everything I Have Is Blue (demo)" – 4:19

Charts

References 

1994 songs
1994 singles
RCA Records singles
The Smithereens songs
Song recordings produced by Don Dixon (musician)
Songs written by Pat DiNizio